Bluesville Records was an American record label subsidiary of Prestige Records, launched in 1959, with the primary purpose of documenting the work of the older classic bluesmen passed over by the changing audience. Such bluesmen as Roosevelt Sykes, Lightnin' Hopkins, Rev. Gary Davis, and Sonny Terry and Brownie McGhee recorded for the label, accounting for more than one quarter of their overall output. By 1966, Bluesville had ceased to issue LPs.

Discography

See also
 List of record labels

References

External links
Prestige - Bluesville discography
Prestige Bluesville 1000 series (12 inch LP)

American record labels
Blues record labels
Record labels established in 1959
American companies established in 1959